John Patrick Cyrier (born May 4, 1973) is an American politician who served as a member of the Texas House of Representatives from the 17th district. Cyrier was first elected in a 2015 special election. He made an unsuccessful bid to become Speaker of the Texas House of Representatives for the 87th legislative session in 2021. Cyrier is a member of the Republican Party.

References

External links
 Campaign website
 State legislative page

Living people
Republican Party members of the Texas House of Representatives
21st-century American politicians
1973 births